Cuautepec de Hinojosa is a town and one of the 84 municipalities of Hidalgo, in central-eastern Mexico. The municipal seat lies at Cuautepec de Hinojosa.  The municipality covers an area of 372.6 km².

As of 2020, the municipality had a total population of 64,421.

References

Municipalities of Hidalgo (state)
Populated places in Hidalgo (state)